Izra' District is a district (mantiqah) administratively belonging to Daraa Governorate, Syria. At the 2004 Census it had a population of 246,804. Its administrative centre is the city of Izra'.

Sub-districts
The district of Izra' is divided into six sub-districts or Nāḥiyas (population according to 2004 official census):
Izra Subdistrict (ناحية ازرع): population 56,760.
Jasim Subdistrict (ناحية جاسم): population 39,624.
Al-Hirak Subdistrict (ناحية الحراك): population 40,979.
Nawa Subdistrict (ناحية نوى): population 57,404.
Al-Shaykh Subdistrict (ناحية الشيخ مسكين): population 34,370.
Tasil Subdistrict (ناحية تسيل): population 17,778.

References

Districts of Daraa Governorate